Chris Heffelfinger (born 1979) is a researcher and writer based in Washington, D.C.. He is the editor of Unmasking Terror: A Global Review of Terrorist Activities. This is a two-volume work published by the Jamestown Foundation . He is also the author of Radical Islam in America: Salafism's Journey from Arabia to the West. He specializes in contemporary and classical Islamic thought.

1979 births
Living people
American male non-fiction writers
American editors
Date of birth missing (living people)